Enyalius boulengeri, also known commonly as the Brazilian fathead anole, is a species of lizard in the family Leiosauridae. The species is endemic to Brazil.

Etymology
The specific name, boulengeri, is in honor of Belgian-born British herpetologist George Albert Boulenger.

Geographic range
E. boulengeri is found in southeastern Brazil, in the Brazilian states of Espírito Santo and Minas Gerais.

Habitat
The preferred natural habitat of E. boulengeri is forest.

Description

Reproduction
E. boulengeri is oviparous. Clutch size is 7–12 eggs.

References

Further reading
Etheridge R (1969). "A review of the iguanid lizard genus Enyalius ". Bulletin of the British Museum (Natural History), Zoology 18 (8): 233–260. (Enyalius  boulengeri, new species, pp. 250–252, Figure 7).
Frost DR, Etheridge R, Janies D, Titus TA (2001). "Total evidence, sequence alignment, evolution of polychrotid lizards, and a reclassification of the Iguania (Squamata, Iguania)". American Museum Novitates (3343): 1–22.
Rodrigues MT, Bertolotto CEV, Amaro RC, Yonenaga-Yassuda Y, Freire EMX, Pellegrino KCM (2014). "Molecular phylogeny, species limits, and biogeography of the Brazilian endemic lizard genus Enyalius (Squamata: Leiosauridae): An example of the historical relationship between Atlantic Forests and Amazonia". Molecular Phylogenetics and Evolution 81: 137–146.

Enyalius
Reptiles described in 1969
Reptiles of Brazil
Taxa named by Richard Emmett Etheridge